Self Made (Hebrew: Boreg) is a 2014 Israeli film directed by Shira Geffen.

Synopsis
The film follows an Israeli artist (Michal) and Palestinian DIY store clerk (Nadine) who swap their lives because of a mix-up at a border security checkpoint.

Cast

Zidane Awad as Ebrahem
Sarah Adler as Michal
Samira Saraya as Nadine
Doraid Liddawi
Na'ama Shoham
Ziyad Bakri

Critical reception
The film was presented at the Cannes Film Festival and at the Jerusalem Film Festival. It was also shown at the opening night of the AICE Israeli Film Festival in Melbourne, Australia.

In a review for The Hollywood Reporter, critic Clarence Tsui said the film was full of "black humor" and "surreal episodes to talk about gritty issues in reality." She added, "What Geffen is trying to put across is how an individual's appearance is just a façade." She concluded that it was, "an entertaining and pensive thought about the straitjackets imposed on women or maybe just about everyone else too."

References

2014 films
Israeli drama films